Portmuck is a townland of 235 acres in County Antrim, Northern Ireland. It is situated in the civil parish of Islandmagee and the historic barony of Belfast Lower.

The townland has given its name to a little island just off the coast called Isle of Muck, which is a nature reserve.

See also 
List of townlands in County Antrim

References

Townlands of County Antrim
Civil parish of Island Magee